Madness Rules (German: Matto regiert) is a 1947 Swiss crime film directed by Leopold Lindtberg and starring Heinrich Gretler, Heinz Woester and Elisabeth Müller. It is based on the 1936 novel of the same name by Friedrich Glauser. Lead actor Gretler reprised his role of the policeman Jakob Studer from the 1939 film Constable Studer, also adapted from a Glauser novel.

Production
The film was shot between December 1946 and March 1947 at the Bellerive and Rosenhof Studios in Zurich with some location shooting around Königsfelden. The film cost around 395,000 Swiss Francs.

Synopsis
The police investigate the murder of the head of a mental hospital who had recently been in dispute with his colleague over their treatment of a young patient.

Cast
 Heinrich Gretler as Constable Jakob Studer  
 Heinz Woester as Doctor Ernst Laduner 
 Elisabeth Müller Sister Irma Wasem  
 Friedrich Braun as Patient  
 Otto Brefin  
 Gottlieb Büchi 
 Zarli Carigiet as Patient 
 Mathilde Danegger as Dr. med Spühler  
 Fritz Delius as Patient  
 Hugo Döblin as Patient  
 Enzo Ertini as Patient  
 Hans Gaugler as Leibundgut  
 Emil Gerber as Pfleger Jutzeler  
 Walburga Gmür  as Patientin  
 Emil Gyr  as Patient  
 Max Haufler as Pfleger Weyrauch  
 Emil Hegetschweiler as Pfleger Gilgen  
 Hans Kaes  as Portier Dreyer  
 Jörn Kübler  as Patient  
 Olaf Kübler  as Herbert Kaplaun  
 Max Werner Lenz as Patient  
 Adolf Manz  as Georg Caplaun 
 Viktor May  as Patient  
 Walter Morath  as Dr. med. Neuveville 
 Irene Naef  as Margrit Laduner  
 Arno Rita as Patient  
 Armin Schweizer as Patient  
 Johannes Steiner as Dr. med Ulrich Borstli  
 Sigfrit Steiner as Kommissar  
 Schaggi Streuli as Nachtwächter

References

Bibliography 
 Fritsche, Maria. Homemade Men in Postwar Austrian Cinema: Nationhood, Genre and Masculinity. Berghahn Books, 2013.

External links 
 

1947 films
1947 crime films
Swiss crime films
Swiss German-language films
Films directed by Leopold Lindtberg
Films based on Swiss novels
Police detective films
Swiss sequel films
Swiss black-and-white films